Antasari-Depok, also known as the Depok-Antasari or Desari Toll Road is a highway in Java, Indonesia, connecting South Jakarta with Sawangan, Depok and Bojong Gede, Bogor.

The toll road extends from Jalan Pangeran Antasari in South Jakarta to Depok. The toll road will be extended to Bogor, at the interchange of Bogor Ring Road and Bogor-Ciawi–Sukabumi Toll Road. Once fully operational, this toll is predicted to reduce congestion along Jagorawi Toll Road. Indonesian President Joko Widodo inaugurated the 5.8 kilometer-long section 1 of the toll road on 27 September 2018.

Sections
The toll road is divided into 3 sections.
Section 1: 5.8 kilometers from Jalan Antasari to Brigif (Operational)
Section II: 6.3 kilometers from Brigif to Sawangan (2.7 km in the Brigif-Krukut Section II A and the Krukut-Sawangan Section II B is 3.6 kilometers long. (operational)
Section III: Along 9.5 kilometers from Sawangan to Bojonggede road in Bogor (expected to complete by 2021).

Toll Gate

Interchange

See also

Trans-Java toll road

References

External links
Progress

Buildings and structures in Jakarta
Toll roads in Indonesia
Toll roads in Java
Transport in Jakarta
Transport in West Java